The Ashram metro station is located on the Pink Line of the Delhi Metro and situated between Vinobapuri and Sarai Kale Khan - Nizamuddin metro station.

History
As part of Phase III of Delhi Metro, Ashram Metro Station was opened for public use from 31 December 2018.

Construction
The station is just 151.6 metre against an average of 265 metre which makes Ashram Metro Station to be the smallest metro station in the system.
Unlike usual two level metro stations, Ashram has 3 levels. Apart from the Concourse and Platform levels, another level called mezzanine floor has been added.

The station

Station layout

Entry/Exit

Connections

Bus
Delhi Transport Corporation bus routes number 274, 306, 400, 402CL, 403, 403CL, 403STL, 404, 404LinkSTL, 405, 405A, 405ASTL,410, 418A, 418ALnkSTL, 460, 460CL, 460STL, 473, 473A, 473CL, 479, 479CL, 479STL, 507CL, 507STL, 894, 894CL, 894STL, AC-479, AC-724A, Ballabgarh Bus Stand – Panipat, Ballabgarh Bus Stand – Sonipat, serves the station.

See also

Delhi
List of Delhi Metro stations
Transport in Delhi
Delhi Metro Rail Corporation
Delhi Suburban Railway
Inner Ring Road, Delhi
Delhi Monorail
Delhi Transport Corporation
South Delhi
Lajpat Nagar
New Delhi
National Capital Region (India)
List of rapid transit systems
List of metro systems

References

External links

 Delhi Metro Rail Corporation Ltd. (Official site)
 Delhi Metro Annual Reports
 
 UrbanRail.Net – Descriptions of all metro systems in the world, each with a schematic map showing all stations.

Delhi Metro stations
Railway stations in South East Delhi district